Carmangay is a village in southern Alberta, Canada. It takes its name from C.W. Carman, who bought  at $3.50 per acre to grow wheat in 1904, and his wife, Gertrude Gay.

History 
Carmangay is the site of the Carmangay Tipi Rings, an archeological tipi ring site. The site does not have much archaeological material, though there has been enough to date it to 200–1700 AD.

Demographics 

In the 2016 Census of Population conducted by Statistics Canada, the Village of Carmangay recorded a population of 242 living in 121 of its 135 total private dwellings, a  change from its 2011 population of 367.

Wind farm 
In 2013, Enbridge and EDF began construction on a 300 MW wind farm east of the Village of Carmangay.  166 wind turbines were constructed at the site, with over 300 workers on the project. The Blackspring Ridge Wind Project was completed in May 2014.

See also 
List of communities in Alberta
List of villages in Alberta

References

External links

1910 establishments in Alberta
Villages in Alberta
Vulcan County
Populated places established in 1936